Theosophy is a religion established in the United States during the late 19th century.

Theosophy may also refer to:
 Theosophical Kabbalah, the stream of Kabbalah that seeks to understand and describe the divine realm
 Christian theosophy, a range of positions within Christianity which focus on the attainment of direct, unmediated knowledge of the nature of divinity and the origin and purpose of the universe
 Transcendent theosophy, the doctrine and philosophy developed by Persian Islamic philosopher Mulla Sadra
 Neo-Theosophy, a term used by the followers of Blavatsky to denominate the system of Theosophical ideas expounded by Annie Besant and Charles Webster Leadbeater following the death of Madame Blavatsky